NGC 514 is a low-luminosity, intermediate spiral galaxy in the equatorial constellation of Pisces, located at a distance of approximately 83 million light-years from the Milky Way. It was discovered on 16 October 1784 by astronomer William Herschel. The general form of the galaxy is specified by its morphological classification of SAB(rs)c, which indicates it has a weak bar system at the core (SAB), an incomplete ring formation around the bar (rs), and somewhat loosely-wound spiral arms (c). This galaxy has an H II nucleus with an extended region that displays weak emission lines in the optical range, but not in the near infrared.

In October 2020 a Type 1a supernova, 2020uxz was detected in NGC 514.

References

External links
 
 

NGC 0514
NGC 0514
0514
00947
05139
17841016
Discoveries by William Herschel